The 2016–17 Bosnia and Herzegovina Football Cup was the 21st edition of Bosnia and Herzegovina's annual football cup, and a seventeenth season of the unified competition.  The winner qualified to the first qualifying round of the 2017–18 UEFA Europa League.

Široki Brijeg won its third title after defeating Sarajevo.

Participating teams
Following teams will take part in 2016–17 Bosnia and Herzegovina Football Cup. As Premier League decreased its number of teams by four, each of two entities got two additional slots for national cup so they have 12 and 8 slots respectively.

Roman number in brackets denote the level of respective league in Bosnian football league system in 2016-17 season

Calendar

First round
Played on 21 September 2016

Second round
Played between 18 and 26 October 2016; over two legs

Quarter final
Played on 8 and 15 March 2017; over two legs

Semi final
Played on 12 and 19/26 April 2017; over two legs.

Final
The final was played over two legs on 10 and 17 May, 2017.

First leg

Second leg

References

External links
Football Federation of Bosnia and Herzegovina
SportSport.ba

2016-17
Cup
Bosnia And Herzegovina